Fay Wesley (Scow) Thomas (October 10, 1903 – August 12, 1990) was a pitcher in Major League Baseball. He pitched for four teams from 1927 to 1935. He also pitched for five teams in the Pacific Coast League from 1930–1943 and was elected to the Pacific Coast League Hall of Fame in 2004. He attended the University of Southern California. He appeared in the film The Pride of the Yankees as Christy Mathewson.

Thomas died on August 12, 1990 from a self-inflicted gunshot wound to the head.

References

External links

1903 births
1990 suicides
Baseball players from Kansas
People from Ellsworth County, Kansas
Suicides by firearm in California
Major League Baseball pitchers
Brooklyn Dodgers players
Cleveland Indians players
New York Giants (NL) players
St. Louis Browns players
USC Trojans baseball players
Ottumwa Cardinals players
New Haven Profs players
Toledo Mud Hens players
Buffalo Bisons (minor league) players
Oklahoma City Indians players
Baltimore Orioles (IL) players
Sacramento Senators players
Oakland Oaks (baseball) players
Los Angeles Angels (minor league) players
Wenatchee Chiefs players
Portland Beavers players
Hollywood Stars players
USC Trojans football players
American football tackles